Keefer Joyce (born January 21, 1994) is a Canadian bobsledder.

He participated at the IBSF World Championships 2019, winning a medal.

References

External links

1994 births
Living people
Canadian male bobsledders